Chacachacare Lighthouse was an active lighthouse located in the north part of Chacachacare atop a hill at an elevation of .

See also
 List of lighthouses in Trinidad and Tobago

References

Lighthouses in Trinidad and Tobago